Jumalten aika (Age of Gods) is the seventh full-length album by Finnish pagan metal band Moonsorrow. It was released on 1 April 2016 through Century Media.

Track listing

Charts

References

2016 albums
Moonsorrow albums